Gerald Foster Wiggins (May 12, 1922 – July 13, 2008) was an American jazz pianist and organist.

Early life
Wiggins was born in New York City on May 12, 1922. He studied classical music, but switched to jazz in his teens.

Later life and career
Wiggins began as a professional career as a musician accompanying comedian Stepin Fetchit. Wiggins worked with Louis Armstrong and Benny Carter. He was in the military from 1944 to 1946. In the 1940s, he moved to Los Angeles, where he played music for television and film. He also worked with singers like Lena Horne (1950–51), Kay Starr,  and Eartha Kitt. In 1960, his best recording as an organist appeared, Wiggin' Out, known for the quality of its music and fresh, clear sound. He recorded another LP at the organ with saxophonist Teddy Edwards. "In the 1960s he worked as a music director and vocal coach in film studios," including "a lengthy stint as vocal coach for Marilyn Monroe."  In the 1970s he often collaborated with vocalist Helen Humes.

Wiggins was known for his trio with Andy Simpkins and Paul Humphrey, among others. He also appeared in an episode of 227, and an episode of Moesha, in both cases he played a pianist. "He appeared regularly at American jazz parties and festivals and occasionally at Japanese and European festivals and was in demand for recording sessions." Late in his career, Wiggins recorded for Concord Records which according to The New Grove Dictionary of Jazz "demonstrate his firm touch, all-round musicianship, and sense of swing."

Personal life and death
Wiggins was married to Lynn Wiggins from 1987 until his death.  He had two children, three step-children, and several grandchildren, and died in Los Angeles on July 13, 2008 at the age of 86.

Selected discography

As leader/co-leader
Wiggin' with Wig (Dig, 1956)
Relax and Enjoy It! (Contemporary, 1956)
Collections (Intro, 1957) with Red Norvo, Art Pepper and Joe Morello
Reminiscin' with Wig (Fresh Sound, 1957)
The King and I ( Challenge, 1957)
The Gerald Wiggins Trio (Tampa Records, 1958)
The Loveliness of You... (Tampa Records, 1958)
Music from "Around the World in 80 days" in Modern Jazz (Specialty 1958) 
Wiggin' out (Hi-Fi Jazz 1960) – as organist
Memory Lane (Ava 1964)
Wig is here (Black and Blue 1977)
A beautiful friendship (Black and Blue 1977)
Live at Maybeck Recital Hall, Volume Eight (Concord 1990)
Soulidarity (Concord 1995)
 Gerry Wiggins and friends (Madwig Music 2002)

As sideman
With Mel Brown
Chicken Fat (Impulse!, 1967)
With Red Callender
The Lowest (MetroJazz, 1958) 
With Benny Carter
Aspects (United Artists, 1959)
With Buddy Collette
Tanganyika (Dig, 1956)
Man of Many Parts (Contemporary, 1956)
Everybody's Buddy (Challenge, 1957)
Porgy & Bess (Interlude 1957 [1959])
With Harry Edison
"Sweets" for the Sweet (Sue, 1964)
Sweets for the Sweet Taste of Love (Vee-Jay, 1964)
With Teddy Edwards
Heart & Soul (as organist) (Contemporary, 1962)
With Tal Farlow
 Autumn In New York (Norgran 1954)
With Paul Horn 
House of Horn (Dot, 1957)
With Illinois Jacquet
Illinois Jacquet and His Orchestra (Verve, 1956)
With Cal Tjader
Cal Tjader Quartet (Fantasy, 1956)
With Gerald Wilson
Jessica (Trend, 1983)

References

External links
Interview of Gerald Wiggins, part of Central Avenue Sounds Oral History Project, Center for Oral History Research, UCLA Library Special Collections, University of California, Los Angeles.
[ All Music]
Gerald Wiggins Interview NAMM Oral History Library, February 13, 2008.

1922 births
2008 deaths
American jazz pianists
American male pianists
West Coast jazz pianists
Challenge Records artists
Specialty Records artists
20th-century American pianists
20th-century American male musicians
American male jazz musicians
The Capp-Pierce Juggernaut members
American military personnel of World War II